Ndriçim Babasi was a member of the Assembly of the Republic of Albania for the Democratic Party of Albania. He joined the assembly following local elections in 2011.

From 27 August 2013, Ndriçim Babasi has been appointed president of Albanian football club, KF Tirana.  Now is not.

Footnotes

Living people
Democratic Party of Albania politicians
Members of the Parliament of Albania
21st-century Albanian politicians
Year of birth missing (living people)